The 2018–19 Sacred Heart Pioneers men's basketball team represented Sacred Heart University during the 2018–19 NCAA Division I men's basketball season. This was the Pioneers' 20th season of NCAA Division I basketball, all played in the Northeast Conference. The Pioneers were led by sixth-year head coach Anthony Latina and played their home games at the William H. Pitt Center in Fairfield, Connecticut.

The Pioneers finished the 2018–19 season 15–17, 11–7 in NEC play to finish in third place. As the three-seed, they lost to six-seed LIU Brooklyn in the quarterfinals of the NEC tournament.

Previous season 
The Pioneers finished the 2017–18 season 10–21, 5–13 in NEC play to finish in ninth place. They failed to qualify for the NEC tournament.

Preseason 
In a poll of league coaches at the NEC media day, the Pioneers were picked to finish in ninth place.

Roster

Schedule and results

|-
!colspan=9 style=| Non-conference regular season

  
|-
!colspan=9 style=| NEC Regular season

  

   
|-
!colspan=9 style=| NEC tournament

References 

Sacred Heart Pioneers men's basketball seasons
Sacred Heart
Sacred Heart Pioneers men's b
Sacred Heart Pioneers men's b